Lincoln Creek may refer to several places:

Lincoln Creek (Missouri), a stream in Missouri
Lincoln Creek (Chehalis River), a stream in Washington